Charles Alfred "Andy" Anderson (June 6, 1902January 9, 1990) was an American geologist. He was the chief geologist of the United States Geological Survey from 1959 to 1964.

Early life
Anderson attended Pomona College, graduating in 1924. He earned his doctorate from the University of California, Berkeley in 1928.

Career

Anderson taught at UC Berkeley for 14 years. He began a career with the United States Geological Survey in 1942, and was its chief geologist from 1959 to 1964.

References

20th-century American geologists
United States Geological Survey personnel
1902 births
1990 deaths
Pomona College alumni
University of California, Berkeley alumni
University of California, Berkeley faculty